PA Media (formerly the Press Association) is a multimedia news agency, and the national news agency of the United Kingdom and Ireland. It is part of PA Media Group Limited, a private company with 26 shareholders, most of whom are national and regional newspaper publishers. The biggest shareholders include the Daily Mail and General Trust, News UK, and Informa. PA Media Group also encompasses Globelynx, which provides TV-ready remotely monitored camera systems for corporate clients to connect with TV news broadcasters in the UK and worldwide; TNR, a specialist communications consultancy; Sticky Content, a digital copywriting and content strategy agency; and StreamAMG, a video streaming business. The group's photography arm, PA Images, has a portfolio comprising more than 20 million photographs online and around 10 million in physical archives dating back 150 years.

History
Founded in 1868 by a group of provincial newspaper proprietors, the PA provides a London-based service of news-collecting and reporting from around the United Kingdom. The news agency's founders sought to produce a more accurate and reliable alternative to the monopoly service of the telegraph companies.  

In January 1870 the agency moved from temporary offices into new headquarters at Wine Office Court, off Fleet Street. At 5am on Saturday 5 February 1870, its first press telegram was transmitted. The agency's first Editor-in-Chief was Arthur Cranfield, appointed in 1926.

In 1995, PA moved from Fleet Street to Vauxhall Bridge Road, enabling the company to rapidly expand its output particularly in the sports and new media divisions.

The Press Association launched the Ananova news website in 2000. Ananova was then sold to Orange.

In December 2013, PA Group sold its weather business MeteoGroup, Europe's largest private sector weather company, to global growth investment firm General Atlantic.

In 2005, the company changed its name to PA Group.

In February 2015, PA announced the sale of its finance publications divisions, which included TelecomFinance and SatelliteFinance.

In September 2018 it was announced that the news agency was renamed from Press Association to PA Media, and the umbrella company from PA Group Limited to PA Media Group Limited. This coincided with a move from their Vauxhall Bridge Road offices to a new space that would accommodate the move toward digital media.

The editor-in-chief of the news agency is Pete Clifton, who was appointed in October 2014.

Other divisions and ventures

PA Training

PA Training is Europe's biggest journalism and media training company. It was formed in 2006, when the Press Association acquired Trinity Mirror's training centre in Newcastle upon Tyne. The NCTJ course in Newcastle has been around since 1969.

The business already owned the former Westminster Press-owned Editorial Centre and merged the two businesses to become PA Training, and has a proud history of training many of the UK's leading journalists.

In 2014, PA's journalism training centre in Newcastle was named by the NCTJ as the best in Britain.

Alamy

Alamy, a global stock photo agency with over 125 million images, was wholly acquired by PA Media in February 2020. The purchase enables PA Media to enter the international stock photography market.

Other subsidiaries
Other subsidiaries include Globelynx, founded in 2001; Sticky Content, acquired in full between 2013 and 2015; StreamAMG (Advanced Media Group), acquired in April 2017; and RADAR, founded in 2017.

See also

EMPICS
Media of the United Kingdom
List of news agencies

References

Companies based in the City of Westminster
Co-operatives in the United Kingdom
Media and communications in the City of Westminster
Communications and media organisations based in the United Kingdom
News agencies based in the United Kingdom
1868 establishments in England
Organizations established in 1868
British companies established in 1868
Mass media companies established in 1868